Man of Miracles is the fourth album by Styx, released on November 8, 1974.

This would be the band's last original album on the independent Chicago-based label Wooden Nickel Records before moving to the major label A&M.

Background

The album had a diverse sound, it showcased the style of two band members and a pre-commercial sound: James "JY" Young songs were more straight ahead hard rockers, while Dennis DeYoung songs were more mellow ballads, classical, and prog rock songs.

The original issue contained the catchy upbeat cover of "Lies" by The Knickerbockers in 1965. A second release of Man of Miracles substituted this with "Best Thing", a song also contained on the first Styx album from 1972, as the opening track on side two.   The album was again reissued in 1980 with new artwork and a newly abbreviated title, Miracles. This version started the second side with the ballad "Unfinished Song", which is sung by Dennis DeYoung.

Track listing

Personnel

Styx
 Dennis DeYoung – vocals, keyboards
 James "JY" Young – vocals, electric guitars
 John Curulewski – vocals, electric and acoustic guitars, synthesizers
 Chuck Panozzo – bass guitar
 John Panozzo – drums, percussion

Production
 Producer: John Ryan for Chicago Kid Productions
 Engineer: Gary Loizzo

Charts
Album – Billboard (United States)

Artwork
The cover art was designed by Leon Rosenblatt, whose name is printed on the back credits as "Lee Rosenblatt."

Miscellaneous
The initials "LJR" are plainly visible in the wizard's beard, and were likely hidden there by the album's artist, Leon J. Rosenblatt.

References

External links 
 Styx - Man of Miracles (1974) album review by Lindsay Planer, credits & releases at AllMusic.com
 Styx - Man of Miracles (1974) album releases & credits at Discogs.com
 Styx - Man of Miracles (1974) album credits & user reviews at ProgArchives.com
 Styx - Man of Miracles (1974) album to be listened as stream at Spotify.com

1974 albums
Styx (band) albums